Martus is a surname. Notable people with the surname include:

Florence Martus (1868–1943), American woman known for greeting ships arriving to Port of Savannah, Georgia between 1887 and 1931
Steffen Martus (born 1968), German literary scholar

See also
 Benetech